Day of Decision is a Canadian historical drama television series which aired on CBC Television in 1959.

Premise
Each episode of this Vancouver-produced series began with a dramatic portrayal of a historical event, concluding at the point before the leading character must make a crucial decision. Then a panel discussed the circumstances of the drama and the decision involved. David Corbett was the show's moderator, with narration by Douglas Campbell.

Scheduling
This half-hour series was broadcast Sundays at 3:30 p.m. (Eastern) from 22 February to 26 April 1959.

External links
 
 

CBC Television original programming
1959 Canadian television series debuts
1959 Canadian television series endings
Black-and-white Canadian television shows